Teleo was a peer-to-peer Voice over Internet Protocol (VoIP) network founded in by Wendell Brown, Andy Moeck and Craig Taro Gold in 2004.

Teleo provided internet telephony applications that bridged the gap between computer desktops, land line phones, and cell phones. Teleo's software allowed users to place and receive phone calls from Microsoft Outlook, Internet Explorer, and other applications.

Teleo users could place free PC-to-PC calls to other Teleo users worldwide; calls from regular telephones were also free. Calls to regular telephones were "pay as you go," at a 2-cent-per-minute rate worldwide. Users could avoid fees by encouraging friends and business associates to install Teleo.

Teleo launched their product at the DEMO conference in early 2005, earning a DEMO God award and garnering significant press coverage.

Teleo was acquired by Microsoft in August 2005, and became part of Microsoft's MSN group in 2006.

Related Services: 

Teleo SMS is a company in India providing peer-to-peer mobile messaging service related to this category. 

To know more visit Teleo SMS website.

References

External links
 http://www.microsoft.com/en-us/news/press/2005/aug05/09-30msnteleopr.aspx

VoIP software
VoIP services